John Conrad Jaeger, FRS (30 July 1907 – 15 May 1979) was an Australian mathematical physicist.

Biography
Jaeger was born in Sydney, Australia to Carl Jaeger, a cigar manufacturer of German origin. In 1924 Jaeger entered Sydney University at the age of 16 and studied engineering, mathematics and physics, gaining a B.Sc. in 1928. He then spent a further two years studying mathematics at Cambridge University, completing Part II of the Mathematical Tripos, after which he stayed on to carry out research in theoretical physics.

In 1936 he taught mathematics at the University of Tasmania, moving to Sydney when appointed to a chair in mathematics at the University of Sydney. There he collaborated with Professor Horatio Scott Carslaw on the application of mathematics to the conduction of heat. Their jointly authored textbook on the subject, Conduction of Heat in Solids, remains a classic in the field.

After the war he moved back to Tasmania as a senior lecturer and wrote a number of books.  Two were new editions of previous books: Operational Methods in Applied Mathematics, jointly with Horatio Carslaw in 1948 and Conduction of Heat in Solids, again with Carslaw in 1959. Two new books were An Introduction to Applied Mathematics in 1951 and An Introduction to the Laplace Transformation in 1959.

In 1951 he was invited to take the new chair of geophysics at the Australian National University in Canberra. He moved there in 1952, gave an inaugural lecture in 1953 and established several research projects over the next three years. The department was later named the Department of Geophysics and Geochemistry. Jaeger retired from the ANU in 1972.

He died in Canberra in 1979. He had married twice: firstly to Sylvia Rees, from whom he was divorced in 1950, and secondly to Martha Elizabeth (Patty) Clarke. He had no children from either marriage.

The Jaeger Medal awarded annually by the Australian Academy of Science recognises his contribution to Australian Earth science.

Honours and awards
1930 Mayhew Prize for Mathematics from the Faculty of Mathematics, University of Cambridge 
1947 Thomas Ranken Lyle Medal for Physics and Mathematics from the Australian National Research Council
1947 Walter Burfitt Prize from the Royal Society of New South Wales
1954 Elected Fellow of the Australian Academy of Science 
1970 Elected Fellow of the Royal Society
1971 Rankine Lecture to the British Geotechnical Association

References

1907 births
1979 deaths
Scientists from Sydney
Alumni of the University of Cambridge
Australian mathematicians
Engineering educators
Rankine Lecturers
Fellows of the Royal Society
Fellows of the Australian Academy of Science